James Lyall may refer to:
James Lyall (minister) (1827–1905), Presbyterian minister of Australia
James Broadwood Lyall (1838–1916), administrator in the Indian Civil Service

See also
Charles James Lyall (1845–1920), English civil servant and scholar working in India